Verron Ulric Haynes (born February 17, 1979) is a Trinidadian-born former American football running back. Verron Haynes was drafted by the Pittsburgh Steelers in the fifth round of the 2002 NFL Draft, following three successful college football seasons at The University of Georgia. With the Steelers, he won Super Bowl XL against the Seattle Seahawks.

Verron appeared on the cover of Pittsburgh Magazines 25 Most Beautiful People issue in January 2007. As of 2010, Haynes serves as an International commentator and television personality for ESPN International.

Born in Trinidad and Tobago, before moving to New York City at age seven and then to Atlanta, Georgia, where he played high school football for North Springs High School.  His father Ulric "Buggy" Haynes was a soccer player in the Trinidad and Tobago national team.

Professional career

Pittsburgh Steelers
In five seasons with the Steelers from 2002 to 2006, Haynes gained 660 yards on 159 carries (4.2 average per carry) and three touchdowns. He also recorded 39 receptions for 322 yards (8.3 average per reception) and two touchdowns, including one from wide receiver Antwaan Randle El. Haynes missed most of the 2006 season due to a knee injury.

On March 1, 2007, he was cut by the Steelers in order to save cap room. However, he re-signed with the team on June 4, 2007. On September 1, 2007, he was released again. He was re-signed on December 24 when starting running back Willie Parker was placed on injured reserve.

Atlanta Falcons
Haynes signed with the Atlanta Falcons on April 29, 2009.

On December 5, 2009, he was released by the Falcons and re-signed on December 8.

Personal
Haynes serves on the board of directors of TurningPoint, a women's health care organization in Alpharetta, Georgia. He is involved in philanthropic efforts and the forming of The Red Sail Watersports company. In addition, Haynes runs The Verron Haynes Foundation and football clinics and camps and comments for ESPN International.

References

External links
 Atlanta Falcons bio
 Pittsburgh Steelers bio

1979 births
Living people
Players of American football from Atlanta
American football fullbacks
Georgia Bulldogs football players
Pittsburgh Steelers players
Atlanta Falcons players
Trinidad and Tobago players of American football
American sportspeople of Trinidad and Tobago descent